Sulak may refer to:

Places
Sulak, Khuzestan, a village in Khuzestan Province, Iran
Sulak, Kohgiluyeh and Boyer-Ahmad, a village in Kohgiluyeh and Boyer-Ahmad Province, Iran
Sulak, Russia, several inhabited localities in Russia
Sulak, Silvan
Sulak (river), a river in the Republic of Dagestan, Russia
Sulak (crater), a crater on Mars
Sūlak, an alternative name of Sulik, a village in West Azerbaijan Province, Iran

People
Stryker Sulak (b. 1986), an American football player
Sulak Sivaraksa (b. 1933), a Thai Buddhist
Lawrence Sulak, American physicist
Libor Šulák (b. 1990), Czech ice hockey player

Other
Šulak, a demon in the Babylonian magico-medical tradition
Sulak, a Soviet-era fishing vessel that in 1969 released a message in a bottle found in Alaska in 2019

Sulak Czech (Šulák): nickname from the vocabulary word šulák 'swindler'scammer,fraud,or trickster.

See also
Novy Sulak, an urban-type settlement in the Republic of Dagestan, Russia